Kwadaso is a town in the Kumasi Metropolitan, a district of the Ashanti Region of Ghana.

References

NB: 
Richard Nana Amoako who is now a district councillor in Belgium, Antwerpen-Merksem once upon a time, lived at Kwadaso in his early life

Populated places in the Ashanti Region